John Ross (born February 19 1938) is a Canadian former curler. He was the third on the 1967 Brier Champion team, representing Ontario (skipped by Alf Phillips, Jr.). The team later went on to finish third at the World Championships of that year.

He is not to be confused with John R. Ross and John K. Ross, curlers from Northern Ontario.

References

Brier champions
1938 births
Living people
Curlers from Ontario
Canadian male curlers